Gavialinum is an extinct genus of teleosaurid thalattosuchian. The type species is Gavialinum rhodoni.

Distribution
Fossils have been found from France that date back to the Bathonian stage of the Middle Jurassic.

Description
Gavialinum rhodoni has a long, narrow snout, much like the current gavialids, from which the Gavialinum genus gets its name. The two are not related, as Gavialinum rhodoni occurred much earlier than any crocodilian. Gavialinum had 33 teeth on each jaw, for a total of 66.

References

External links
Gavialinum in the Paleobiology Database

Prehistoric pseudosuchian genera
Prehistoric marine crocodylomorphs
Middle Jurassic crocodylomorphs
Jurassic reptiles of Europe
Fossils of France